Gao Xiang (Chinese:高翔; Pinyin: Gāo Xiáng) (born: February 14, 1989 in Qingdao) is a Chinese football player who plays as a midfielder for Zibo Qisheng in China League Two.

Club career

Qingdao Hailifeng
Gao Xiang would start his football career playing for the Qingdao Hailifeng youth team and would graduate from their football academy in 2007.

Chengdu Blades
Gao would move to top tier side Chengdu Blades in the 2008 Chinese Super League season and would make his debut on September 6, 2008 against Shenzhen Xiangxue in a 0-0 draw. He would go on to establish himself as a squad regular within the team and would make fifteen appearances in his debut season for the club. Continuing to be a squad regular Gao would find out that the club would be relegated to the second tier when it was discovered that they fixed several games in 2007 to help them in their process for promotion to the top tier. Gao decided to remain faithful towards the club and would play in fifteen league games and scored five goals to aid Chengdu gain promotion at the end of the season.

Qingdao Hainiu
On 16 February 2015, Gao transferred to China League One side Qingdao Hainiu. He would become an integral member of the team that would win the 2019 China League One division and promotion into the top tier.

Career statistics
.

Honours

Club
Qingdao Huanghai
China League One: 2019

References

External links
Player stats at sohu.com
 

1989 births
Living people
Association football midfielders
Chinese footballers
Footballers from Qingdao
Chengdu Tiancheng F.C. players
Qingdao F.C. players
Chinese Super League players
China League One players